Jovan Djordjević (born 22 January 1985), is a Serbian futsal player who plays for Marbo Intermezzo and the Serbia national futsal team.

References

External links 
 UEFA profile

1985 births
Living people
Serbian men's futsal players